Ciupercă is a Romanian surname. Notable people with the surname include:

Nicolae Ciupercă (1882–1950), Romanian general
Valeriu Ciupercă (born 1992), Moldovan-born Russian footballer
Vasile Silvian Ciupercă (1949–2022), Romanian politician

Romanian-language surnames